Nasima Ferdushe is a Bangladesh Awami League politician and the former Member of Bangladesh Parliament from a reserved seat.

Early life
Ferdushe was born on 3 April 1962 and she had studied up to H.S.C. degree.

Career
Ferdushe was elected to parliament from reserved seat as a Bangladesh Awami League candidate in 2014.

References

Awami League politicians
Living people
1968 births
Women members of the Jatiya Sangsad
10th Jatiya Sangsad members
21st-century Bangladeshi women politicians
21st-century Bangladeshi politicians